Passo may refer to:

Places
 Passo, Missouri, United States
 Passô, Porto, Portugal

Other uses
 Oscar Passo (born 1980), Colombian former footballer
 Toyota Passo, a Japanese subcompact car

See also
 Passo, Italian for mountain pass and is a component in multiple place names (see )
 Passos (disambiguation)